There is about 20GW of coal-fired power. In 2019 coal-fired power stations generated almost 40% of Vietnams electricity and about a quarter of the coal was imported.

Source : Initial query from Coal Tracker, updated with data from MOIT 2019 Report 58/BC-CBT, updated using press releases, updated from PDP 7A

Notes 

 Announced: Projects that are in the planning decision of the government or companies but have not yet obtained a permit or permission for land use rights, coal supply rights...
 Pre-permit development: Projects have started to implement one of the following items: environmental licenses, land and water use rights, financial security, transmission contract guarantees, etc.
 Permitted: Projects that have been licensed for environmental licenses but have not yet begun to break ground.
 Construction: Projects are being built after the groundbreaking ceremony.
 Shelved: Projects do not have specific information on the project's progress but do not have enough information to declare the project cancelled.
 Operating: Projects with an official date of Commercial Operation Date (COD).

Sources

References 

Coal-fired power stations in Vietnam
Power stations in Vietnam
Power stations, coal
Lists of coal-fired power stations